The 2021 FEI European Dressage Championships was held in Hagen, Germany, from 7 to 12 September 2021. Budapest in Hungary was supposed to organise the European Championships but withdrew after the postponement of the 2020 Olympic Games to 2021. First, the FEI announced there will be no European Championships for Dressage, but after several riders, trainers, owners and the European Equestrian Federation (EEF) insisted on a European Championship, Hagen volunteered to organise it. The European Championships for show-jumping will be also held in Germany, at the show location of Olympic gold-medalist Ludger Beerbaum in Riesenbeck.

The FEI decided to allocate the European Championships for Grand Prix riders under the age of 25 as well to Hagen. It is for the first time since the introduction of this European Championship that this championship will be combined with the Championship for the seniors. In 2016, Hagen also organised the first edition of the U25 European Championships.

Ground Jury
The Ground Jury during the 2021 European Dressage Championships is nominated as follows;
  Henning Lehrmann (Ground Jury President)
  Mariëtte Sanders (Ground Jury Member)
  Isobel Wessels (Ground Jury Member)
  Maria Colliander (Ground Jury Member)
  Thomas Lang (Ground Jury Member)
  Isabelle Judet (Ground Jury Member)
  Susanne Baarup (Ground Jury Member)
  Jacques van Daele (FEI Technical Delegate)

Ground jury panel for the U25:
  Evi Eisenhardt (Ground Jury President)
  Hans-Christian Matthiesen (Ground Jury Member)
  Irina Maknami (Ground Jury Member)
  Clive Halsall (Ground Jury Member)
  Francis Verbeek (Ground Jury Member)

Medalists

Dressage seniors

Dressage Grand Prix Under 25

Medal summary

Medal table

References

External links
 Official site

FEI-recognized competition
European
FEI
European Dressage Championships
FEI